Borbotana nivifascia is a moth in the family Noctuidae. It is found in the north-eastern part of the Himalaya, Burma, Sundaland, Sulawesi and from the Moluccas to the Solomons. It is also known from Papua New Guinea and Australia (Queensland).

Subspecies
Borbotana nivifascia nivifascia (Australia)
Borbotana nivifascia tumefacta Warren, 1913 (Himalaya)
Borbotana nivifascia longidens Prout, 1926 (Burma, Sundaland, Sulawesi, Moluccas to Solomons)

References

Moths described in 1858
Hadeninae